This is a list of villages and settlements in Akwa Ibom State, Nigeria organised by local government area (LGA) and district/area (with postal codes also given). Udōng Attah Akan village, Udōng Ejo, Utitntai, Ikot Udo Aduak Village in Ibesit Clan of Oruk Anam LGA.

By postal code
Below is a list of Districts, including villages and schools, organised by postal code.

By electoral ward
Below is a list of polling units, including villages and schools, organised by electoral ward.

References

Akwa Ibom